Bed and breakfast is a type of guest accommodation.

Bed & Breakfast may also refer to:
 Bed & Breakfast (band), a German boy band
 "Bed & Breakfast" (Bob's Burgers), an episode of the television series Bob's Burgers
 Bed and Breakfast (album), two albums released by Spookey Ruben
 Bed and breakfasting, or wash sale, a share dealing technique used to establish a loss for tax purposes

Films 
 Bed and Breakfast (1930 film), directed by Walter Forde, starring Jane Baxter and Richard Cooper
 Bed and Breakfast (1938 film), directed by Walter West
 Bed & Breakfast (1992 film), directed by Robert Ellis Miller, starring Roger Moore, Talia Shire, Colleen Dewhurst, and Nina Siemaszko
 Bed & Breakfast (2010 film), directed by Márcio Garcia and written by Leland Douglas